Kilcoo ( – from the legend that Saint Patrick's body stayed there while on its way to Downpatrick to be buried) is a small village and civil parish in County Down, Northern Ireland. It lies between Rathfriland and Castlewellan and is within the Newry, Mourne and Down District Council area. Kilcoo had a population 1415 people in the 2001 Census.

Places of interest
Near Kilcoo is Lough Island Reavy, a small man-made lough. East of the lough is Drumena Cashel, a stone ringfort that was used in the Early Christian period (500–1200 AD).

Education
Saint Malachy's Primary School is a mixed gender school for students between the age of 4 and 11. It was opened in September 1970.

Sport
The village has one sporting club, Kilcoo GAC. This a Gaelic Athletic Association club with teams in Gaelic football and Camogie

2001 Census
Kilcoo is classified as a rural settlement by the Northern Ireland Statistics and Research Agency (NISRA) . Kilcoo is named as Tollymore Ward SOA 1 (Super Output Area) as the data contains the village itself and surrounding townlands of the village. On Census day (29 April 2001) there were 1415 people living in the Kilcoo area. Of these:

29.6% were under 16 years old and 12.2% were aged 60 and above 
53.1% of the population were male and 46.9% were female 
99.6% were from a Catholic Community Background and 0.4% were from a 'Protestant and Other Christian (including Christian related)' Community Background. 
1.1% of people aged 16–74 were unemployed.

Civil parish of Kilcoo
The civil parish is mainly in the historic barony) of Iveagh Upper, Lower Half with one townland in Iveagh Upper, Upper Half.

Townlands

The civil parish contains the following townlands:

Aghacullion
Ardaghy
Ballaghbeg
Ballyhafry
Ballymoney
Burrenbane
Burrenreagh
Clonachullion
Cock Mountain Common
Cross
Drumena
Fofannybane
Fofannyreagh
Letalian
Moneyscalp
Moyad
Slievenalargy
Tollymore Park
Tullybranigan
Tullynasoo
Tullyree

See also
List of civil parishes of County Down

References

Villages in County Down